Baima Township is a township of Zhongning County on the eastern bank of the Yellow River in central Ningxia, located  from the river itself and  northeast of the county seat. , it has seven villages under its administration:
Baima Village
Zhulu Village
Bailu Village
Sandaohu Village
Zhang'en Village
Yuejin Village
Xintian Village

See also 
 List of township-level divisions of Ningxia

References 

Township-level divisions of Ningxia
Zhongning County